Galchev is a Bulgarian surname. Notable people with the surname include:

Boris Galchev (born 1983), Bulgarian footballer
Filaret Galchev (born 1963), Greek/Russian businessman
Patrick-Gabriel Galchev (born 2001), Bulgarian footballer

Bulgarian-language surnames